In China They Eat Dogs is a 1999 Danish action comedy film directed by Lasse Spang Olsen, and starring Kim Bodnia, and Dejan Čukić.

Plot
Arvid (Dejan Čukić), a bank teller, is dumped by his girlfriend for being too boring and dull. Hoping to put some excitement in his life, Arvid helps stop a robbery at the bank. The wife of the would-be bank robber tracks Arvid down and tells him her husband was robbing the bank only so he could pay for medical treatments so they could have a child. The title is a reference to an axiom Arvid's brother tells him: "In China, they eat dogs"; which makes him realize that there is no such thing as moral absolutism, and that whether something is right or wrong depends on the situation.  Because of his revelation, he comes to sympathize with the bank robber.  Imagining he can help the couple and prove himself to be a dangerous outlaw all at once, Arvid plots a robbery of his own bank with the help of his brother Harald (Kim Bodnia) and some fellow wannabe criminals.

Prequel
In 2002 a prequel titled Old Men in New Cars was released. It was again directed by Lasse Spang Olsen, and had Kim Bodnia reprising his role as Harald.

References

External links

1999 films
1999 action comedy films
Danish action comedy films
Films about the Serbian Mafia
Films with screenplays by Anders Thomas Jensen
Serbian-language films
1990s Danish-language films